Mike Hastings (born February 3, 1966) is the current head ice hockey coach of the Minnesota State University, Mankato Mavericks.  He was formerly the head coach and general manager of the Omaha Lancers in the United States Hockey League. He is also the coach for the United States World Juniors team.

Career
He was the head coach of the Omaha/River City Lancers from 1994–2008 where he was twice named the USHL Coach of the Year (1996–97 and 2001–02) and five times was named the USHL General Manager of the Year (1997, 2002, 2005, 2007 and 2008).

After a successful 14-year run in the USHL Hastings returned to the college ranks, joining the staff at Minnesota as an assistant for a year before becoming an associate head coach at Nebraska–Omaha. After three years with the Mavericks Hastings accepted the head coaching position at Minnesota State. When Hastings arrived in Mankato the program had only one winning season in the previous nine years and he immediately turned the program around. In his first year the team doubled their win total, going 24–14–3 and making the second NCAA tournament appearance since joining Division I in 1996. The team improved in each of the next two seasons, winning the WCHA tournament both years and was the #1 seed in the 2015 NCAA Tournament.

In the 2021 Tournament, Hastings and Minnesota State won 2 games on their way to the Frozen Four. Hastings' 5 consecutive 20+ win seasons to start his career led to Minnesota State giving him a 10-year contract extension in the spring of 2017.

Head coaching record

College

References

External links

1966 births
Place of birth missing (living people)
Living people
Rochester Mustangs players
St. Cloud State Huskies men's ice hockey players
St. Cloud State Huskies men's ice hockey coaches
United States Hockey League coaches
Minnesota Golden Gophers men's ice hockey coaches
Minnesota State Mavericks men's ice hockey coaches
American men's ice hockey defensemen